Apex, Nevada is the location of a landfill of the same name in Clark County, Nevada. It is among the biggest landfills in the world and is the largest in the United States, as measured by tons of waste accepted per day.  At its peak it accepted 15,000 tons of waste per day. It is expected to have capacity for over 200 years of waste at current rates. It is owned by Republic Services. It is located just outside the city limits of North Las Vegas.

Republic Services owns and operates the landfill. Arrolime, Nevada is located about 2 miles northeast of Apex.

References 

Landfills in the United States
Clark County, Nevada